In music, Op. 42 stands for Opus number 42. Compositions that are assigned this number include:

 Arnold – Homage to the Queen
 Britten – Saint Nicolas
 Bruch – Romance in A minor
 Busoni – Berceuse élégiaque
 Chopin – Waltz in A-flat major, Op. 42
 Elgar – Diarmuid and Grania
 Glière – Symphony No. 3
 Haydn – String Quartet in D Minor, Op. 42
 Holst – At the Boar's Head
 Ippolitov-Ivanov – Caucasian Sketches, Suite No. 2
 Mendelssohn – Psalm 42
 Nielsen – Fynsk Foraar
 Rachmaninoff – Variations on a Theme of Corelli
 Rautavaara – Études
 Schumann – Frauenliebe und -leben
 Shostakovich – Five Fragments
 Tchaikovsky – Souvenir d'un lieu cher
 Widor – Symphony for Organ No. 5
 Widor – Symphony for Organ No. 6